The Rainforest Band was a jam band that spans several genres, including jazz, rock, world music, R&B, and funk. Founded in 1990, it produced four albums and performed for ten years.

History
The Rainforest Band began in 1990 with the Grammy-nominated album Blues From the Rainforest, a collaboration between jazz keyboardist Merl Saunders, percussionist Muruga Booker, and Grateful Dead guitarist Jerry Garcia, with Shakti Booker (vocals), Eddie Moore (percussion), Melvin Seals (sound effects) and Bill Thompson (drum & sampled sound midi-technician). This fusion of world music and jazz was an early hit in a genre which became a category for the Grammys that same year. The music itself was written by Saunders and Booker, and Garcia added tracks both with electric guitar and MIDI-guitar mimicking flute, and sampled sounds from the Amazonian rainforest were incorporated into the music throughout.

Although the album was billed as a Merl Saunders album, in the tour that followed the group was billed as The Rainforest Band, and the album is generally regarded as the first release of the band. For the next ten years they played with an ever-changing line-up of musicians, many from the Grateful Dead family of musicians. They were a favorite Earth Day act; one of their albums was called Save the Planet So We’ll Have Someplace to Boogie, and a familiar chant at performances was “Every Day is Earth Day”.

Their albums were produced by Sumertone Records, Merl Saunders’ label, and a portion of the proceeds went to the Rainforest Action Network. In 1999 a DVD of Blues From the Rainforest was released, containing the entire album from the original masters, concert footage of their September 24, 1990 performance at the Great American Music Hall in San Francisco, a music video of the title track, and the documentary Rediscovering the Amazon, chronicling Saunders’ trip to the Amazonian rainforest and showcasing the issue of rainforest destruction.

After a nearly ten-year period in which Muruga and Shakti Booker had broken from the band, a reunion took place between Merl Saunders and Muruga and Shakti Booker at the Starwood Festival in 2000. This appearance was to be the launching point of a new tour starting at Nelson's Ledges Quarry Park in 2002; however, it was to be the last performance of the Rainforest Band with Merl Saunders. Merl’s health declined, and he suffered a stroke in 2002, and never performed in this or any of his other musical projects again. He died October 24, 2008.

Other artists who have performed as part of the Rainforest Band include Tony Saunders, Mike Hinton, Vince Littleton, Larry Vann, Michael Warren, Steve Kimock, Karen Baker, Tammy Tambora, and John Popper.

A re-launch of the Rainforest Band as a tribute to Merl Saunders took place at the 29th Starwood Festival on July 25, 2009, featuring Merl’s son bassist Tony Saunders, guitarist Michael Hinton, drummer Bill Norwood, keyboardist Mike Emerson (Tommy Castro, Elvin Bishop, Petty Theft), and vocalist Misa Malone. Also appearing were Sikiru Adepoju on talking drum and Douglas "Val" Serrant on steel drum and djembe. Muruga Booker has also formed his own version of the Rainforest Band and recorded a CD (that has not yet been released) in 2010 featuring Badal Roy, Perry Robinson and the final recordings of James Gurley.

Discography
 1990 - Blues From The Rainforest: A Musical Suite - Featuring Muruga Booker, Eddie Moore, Shakti, Special Guest: Jerry Garcia
 1991 - Save The Planet So We'll Have Someplace To Boogie - Merl Saunders & the Rainforest Band
 1993 - It's In The Air - Merl Saunders & the Rainforest Band
 1998 - Fiesta Amazonica - Merl Saunders & the Rainforest Band

Filmography
 1997: A Tribute to Jerry Garcia: Deadheads Festival Japan 1997 (Japanese Laser Disc, Video Super Rock series VPLR-70650)
 1999: Blues from the Rainforest: A Musical Suite (Mobile Fidelity) DVD

References

1990 establishments in California
2010 disestablishments in California
American rock music groups
American jazz ensembles from California
Jam bands
American world music groups
Musical groups established in 1990
Musical groups disestablished in 2010